BOHS can refer to:
British Occupational Hygiene Society
Brea Olinda High School, California 
The Bank of the Holy Spirit, founded by the Pope in 1605
Bohemian F.C., an Irish association football club